The 1889 World Championship was an exhibition football match that took place in Glasgow, Scotland, on 3 October 1889 between the winners of the Scottish Cup, Third Lanark (then known as 3rd Lanarkshire Rifle Volunteers), and the English Double winners of the Football League and FA Cup, Preston North End. The match finished 3–3, although Third Lanark took a 2–0 lead into half time.

The Football World Championship had always been contested between the victors of the national cups of England and Scotland, which were the eminent club football competitions in the world at the time.  The Football League in England was established in 1888–89 but it only consisted of clubs from the North and Midlands during its formative years.  Nonetheless, Preston went through the inaugural season unbeaten and won the championship, earning the nickname "The Invincibles". They further asserted their dominance by winning that season's FA Cup. The Scottish Football League wouldn't be founded until 1890–91.

An attendance of 6,000 was reported at Third Lanark's Cathkin Park for the spectacle. Among the crowd were the players of Blackburn Rovers, Preston's Lancashire rivals – who played Celtic, Third Lanark's Glasgow rivals, at Celtic Park that same day. The local newspaper The Glasgow Herald reported on the two matches in equal detail and prominence as bank holiday cross-border challenge matches with no particular attention given to the fact that Thirds v Preston was a contest between the cup-holders, although the previous year's fixture at the same venue between Renton and West Bromwich Albion was given far greater attention in the same publication.

Participant teams

Match details

|valign="top"| 
|valign="top" width="50%"|

|}

References

Further reading
  

1888–89 in English football
1888–89 in Scottish football
World Championship 1889
World Championship 1889
October 1889 sports events
International association football competitions hosted by Scotland
1880s in Glasgow